The Samsung Town (Korean: 삼성타운) is a major office park in Seocho-gu in Seoul, South Korea.  It serves as the IT and electronics hub for the multinational corporation Samsung.

The building has a floor area of 110,800 m² with 20,000 resident employees, and President Lee Kun-hee's office was located on the 42nd floor of Building C.

Samsung Electronics, Samsung C&T, and Samsung Life Insurance have built three buildings which are 44, 34 and 32 stories respectively. Samsung Town was designed by Kohn Pedersen Fox. Samsung Electronics and Samsung C&T have already begun to move into the houses  while Samsung Life Insurance is leasing its property to Samsung Electronics and other affiliates.

References

External links

Samsung
Office buildings completed in 2008
Kohn Pedersen Fox buildings
Skyscraper office buildings in Seoul
2008 establishments in South Korea
Buildings and structures in Seocho District